Nguyễn Minh Tùng (born 9 August 1992) is a Vietnamese professional footballer who plays as a centre back for Thanh Hóa in the V.League 1.

Honours

Club
Đông Á Thanh Hóa
Vietnamese National Cup:
 Third place : 2022

Vietnam U23
 Southeast Asian Games Third place: 2015

References

External links 
 

1992 births
Living people
Vietnamese footballers
Vietnam international footballers
Association football central defenders
Thanh Hóa FC players
Than Quang Ninh FC players
People from Thanh Hóa province
Footballers at the 2014 Asian Games
Southeast Asian Games bronze medalists for Vietnam
Southeast Asian Games medalists in football
Competitors at the 2015 Southeast Asian Games
Asian Games competitors for Vietnam